Clibanites is a genus of fungi in the class Sordariomycetes. This is a monotypic genus, containing the single species Clibanites paradoxa.

References

External links
Clibanites at Index Fungorum

Bionectriaceae
Monotypic Sordariomycetes genera